Sorceress is a 1982 sword and sorcery film directed by Jack Hill (credited as Brian Stuart), and starring Leigh Harris and Lynette Harris.

As of 2022, it is the last feature film Jack Hill has directed.

Plot 

To maintain his powers, the evil wizard Traigon must sacrifice his firstborn child to the god Caligara.  After giving birth to twin daughters, his wife refused to tell Traigon which was born first, and he inflicts a mortal wound upon her. She flees with the young children and convinces a peasant to raise them as warrior boys. When Traigon appears, his wife is able to stab him with a spear and magically banish him for 20 years before she dies.

When Traigon returns, he resumes hunting down his now-adult daughters (the Harris sisters), still intending to sacrifice them to Caligara. The twins enlist the help of a satyr, Pando, a barbarian, Erlik, and a Viking, Baldar, in their struggle to defeat their own father.

Cast 
 Leigh Harris as Mira
 Lynette Harris as Mara
 Bob Nelson as Erlick
 David Millbern as Pando
 Bruno Rey as Baldar
 Ana De Sade as Delissia
 Roberto Ballesteros as Traigon
 Douglas Sanders as Hunnu
 Tony Stevens as Khrakannon
 Martin LaSalle as Krona

Production

Development
Hill says Corman approached him to do a sword and sorcery film inspired by the success of Conan the Barbarian. Hill:
At that time, Roger had a special effects studio [at the New World Studios in Venice, California] that was doing really good work. They had done some of the special effects work on [John Carpenter's] Escape from New York [1981] and some other big pictures, and Corman owned the special effects unit himself, so he could do it for a low budget. So to me, it was an opportunity to make something that would look like a big movie, which I had never had an opportunity to do before. I thought this might get me back in business doing mainstream pictures.
"I should have known better," joked Hill later.

Jack Hill said he was inspired to do a film about twin girls inspired by The Corsican Brothers.

Hill says he wrote the script "entirely" but Jim Wynorski is the only one credited. Hill says "the dialogue was unfortunately all dubbed in by amateurs and office employees, of which I was not involved in."

According to Hill, Corman wanted to make the film in the Philippines, then got a deal to do it in Portugal. Hill visited that country and found out they did not have the facilities. Corman was then going to make it in Italy, which Hill thought would be ideal. Then two weeks before filming Corman told Hill he had arranged a better deal in Mexico, and that is where the film was shot.

Hill said "We were there for three or four months while they put together this very strange kind of deal with various crooks like (on one side) the Mexican government and (on the other side) Hemdale, which is now very notorious."

Shooting
The movie was shot in Mexico in October 1981. Production was extremely difficult, plagued by rain, fire, and low budget. Hill claimed that Roger Corman never delivered the budget he promised, forcing him to compromise on both special effects and music. (Hill says the rise in the video market caused the decline in drive ins and Corman was even more worried than usual about money.)

Hill says the Mexican crew "worked their hearts out on the film" but also told him "this production had the most problems of any movie they had ever been on - all kinds of things went wrong. The Mexican film vault on the studio lot even blew up."

Hill wrote the part of Pando for Sid Haig who had appeared in many of Hill's films but Corman would not pay the actor's fee so another person played the role.

Like many New World films of the time, it re-used James Horner's musical score from Battle Beyond the Stars (1980).

Reception
Hill took his name off the film, which only made a little over $1.3 million at the box office. It became the last time he and Corman ever worked together.

The Los Angeles Times called it "a fairly shabby movie."

Corman went on to make a series of sword and sorcery films including Deathstalker and Deathstalker 2.

References

External links 
 
 
Sorceress at Letterbox DVD
 Jack Hill on Sorceress at Trailers From Hell

Films directed by Jack Hill
1982 films
1982 horror films
New World Pictures films
American sword and sorcery films
Mexican adventure films
1980s English-language films
Films produced by Roger Corman
1980s American films
1980s Mexican films